Bugis (Kampong Bugis in Malay) is an area in Singapore that covers Bugis Street now located within the Bugis Junction shopping mall. Bugis Street was renowned internationally from the 1950s to the 1980s for its nightly gathering of transvestites and transsexuals, a phenomenon that made it one of Singapore's most notable destinations for foreign visitors during that period.

In the mid-1980s, Bugis Street underwent major urban redevelopment into a retail complex of modern shopping malls, restaurants and nightspots mixed with regulated back-alley roadside vendors. Underground digging to construct the Bugis MRT station prior to that also caused the upheaval and termination of the nightly transgender sex bazaar culture, marking the end of a colourful and unique era in Singapore's history.

Today, the original Bugis Street is now a cobblestoned, relatively wide avenue sandwiched between the buildings of the Bugis Junction shopping complex. On the other hand, the lane presently touted as "Bugis Street" by the Singapore Tourist Promotion Board is actually developed from New Bugis Street, formerly Albert Street, and is billed as "the largest street-shopping location in Singapore". An attempt by the Singapore Tourist Promotion Board to bring back the former exotic atmosphere was unsuccessful. Although the street is now not a well-known tourist destination, it is frequented by many Singaporeans.

History 

Bugis Street lies in an extensive area which was commonly referred to Xiao Po (小坡; 'little slope') by the Chinese-speaking community in the past. The latter stretched all the way from Tanjong Pagar, through Singapore's Chinatown, to Jalan Sultan. Its length was thriving and crammed with merchants and traders, making it one of the most vibrant economic zones of old Singapore.

Pre-1950s 

Before the arrival of the British, there used to be a large canal which ran through the area where the Bugis, a seafaring people from South Sulawesi province in Indonesia, could sail up, moor their boats and trade with Singaporean merchants. It was these people after whom the thoroughfare was named. The Bugis, or Buginese, also put their sailing skills to less benign uses and gained a reputation in the region as pirates. A large influx of them migrated to the present area from Tanjungpinang in January 1820 fleeing a battle between 400 Buginese and Dutch artillery soldiers in retaliation for the death of a chieftain murdered in a violent scuffle that ensued due to the Dutch captain apprehending several Bugis men opening shots celebrating a wedding of said chieftain's cousin.

During the early colonial era, there also used to be low mounds of whitish sand in the area, earning the street the familiar Hokkien (Min Nan) moniker of Peh Soa Pu or Bai Sha Fu in Mandarin (白沙浮; 'white sand mounds'). The Cantonese, however, referred to the street as Hak Gaai or Hei Jie in Mandarin (黑街; 'black street') as there were many clubs catering to the Japanese invaders in the 1940s. During the first half of the 20th century, commuters could travel from Bugis Street to anywhere else in Xiao Po via a tram service which ran along North Bridge Road, which was referred to by the Chinese-educated as Xiao Po Da Ma Lu (小坡大马路; 'little slope main road').

Prior to the second world war, Bugis had a high proportion of Japanese prostitutes; Karayuki-san. At its peak, there were 633 Karauki-san to 109 brothels, with a high concentration within the area of Bugis Street, Malabar Street, and Hylam Street. Due to the lack of space in the early-style, two storey, shophouse, overcrowding and hygiene issues became problematic. With many people using the same latrines and drinking water sources, disease spread with a cholera outbreak occurring in Bugis, Malabar, and Hylam Streets. This led to them being zoned off. The bad hygiene and poor ventilation due to overcrowding of the sites led to the Singapore Improvement Trust trying to demolish those buildings and rebuild. This led to the infamous "Bugis Street Case" which over the course of multiple courts decisions, decided that it was not legal to commandeer a building and only pay the price of the land, which had been going on previously and the decision was made by 1937, that new houses should be built to alleviate overcrowding and problems that are associated instead of tearing it down and rebuilding, expecting change to occur. This established a new form of slum clearance in Singapore that was more closely tied to the rights of the citizen and the owner.

1950s–1980s 

After World War II, hawkers gathered there to sell food and goods. There was initially also a small number of outdoor bars set up beside rat-infested drains.

When transvestites began to rendezvous in the area in the 1950s, they attracted increasing numbers of Western tourists who came for the booze, the food, the pasar malam shopping and the "girls". Business boomed and Bugis Street became a lively and bustling area, forming the heart of Xiao Po. It was one of Singapore's most famous tourist meccas from the 1950s to the 1980s, renowned internationally for its nightly parade of flamboyantly-dressed transvestites and it attracted hordes of Caucasian gawkers who had never before witnessed Asian queens in full regalia.

There was an adage amongst Westerners that one could easily tell a transgender woman from a cisgender woman: the transvestites and trans women were drop-dead gorgeous, while the rest were cisgender (in their view, ordinary) women. The amount of revenue that the trans communities of Bugis Street raked in was considerable, providing a booster shot in the arm for the tourism industry. The street was popularly called  Boogie Street by British servicemen.

Veterans recall that the notorious drinking section began from Victoria Street west to Queen Street. Halfway between Victoria and Queen Streets, there was an intersecting lane parallel to the main roads, also lined with al fresco bars. There was a well-patronised public toilet with a flat roof of which there are archival photos, complete with jubilant rooftop transvestites.

One of the "hallowed traditions" bestowed upon the area by sojourning sailors (usually from Britain, Australia, and New Zealand), was the ritualistic "dance of the flaming arseholes" on top of the toilet's roof. Compatriots on the ground would chant the signature "Haul 'em down you Zulu warrior" song whilst the sailors performed their act.

While many were concerned about the public image and embarrassment that went along with it, the global concern of HIV/AIDS became more prevalent, a growing suspicion of the activities that took place. The HIV scare in Singapore can draw parallels with the English syphilis scare. Bugis Street was demolished as a way of not only controlling the population to become more orderly and normative, but also to prevent an HIV epidemic. With fears also being present that through homosexuality, the society and culture would denigrate and would limit the island's growth, especially post independence. By allowing a site like Bugis Street would go against the idea of Singapore's nuclear family and is, therefore, "othered" this othering scares the Singaporean authorities as it can be seen as dissenting. By using an HIV scare and the economic benefits of inserting an MRT station and eventually a mall, the amount of resistance from most Singaporeans would be minimal.

The earliest published description of Bugis Street found by Yawning Bread as a place of great gender diversity was in the book "Eastern Windows" by F.D. Ommaney, 1960. Ommaney did not date specifically his description of the street but his book made clear that he was in Singapore from 1955 to 1960. A first-person account of Bugis Street in the 1950s is by "Bob", a visiting Australian sailor is given here.

In the mid-1980s, Bugis Street underwent major urban redevelopment into a retail complex of modern shopping malls, restaurants and nightspots mixed with regulated back-alley roadside vendors. Underground digging to construct the Bugis MRT station prior to that also caused the upheaval and termination of the nightly transgender sex bazaar culture, marking the end of a colourful and unique era in Singapore's history.

Tourist and local lamentation of the loss sparked attempts by the Singapore Tourist Promotion Board (STPB) to attempt to recreate some of the old sleazy splendour by staging contrived "Ah Qua shows" on wooden platforms, but these artificial performances fell flat on their faces and failed to pull in the crowds. They were abandoned after a short time.

The movie 

The trans women of Bugis Street were immortalised in an English-language film made by a Hong Kong film company which did employ some local talent in its production.(For more details, see Bugis Street (Film)  and Singapore gay films: Bugis Street).

Another famous movie about Bugis street is Saint Jack, made by the American director Peter Bogdanovich in 1979. However, the movie is controversial because it was banned by the authority for depicting Singapore as a “haven for pimps and whores”.

Features 
The fame of the original Bugis Street has spawned many namesakes eager to capitalise on the brand, even though many tourists, as well as some young Singaporeans, have no inkling as to the reasons for its erstwhile "glamour". This has been inherited to the Bugis Junction, Bugis+ and Bugis MRT station.

The original Bugis Street became part of the Bugis Village, where shops such as Alice, RUSH, Covet and NAVI are also there, it also inherits the same style as Far East Plaza.

Queen Street Bus Terminal 
Queen Street Bus Terminal also known as Ban San Bus Terminal, is a bus terminal in Singapore. Queen Street Bus Terminal serves as the terminal for cross-border bus and taxi services to Johor Bahru, Malaysia.

See also 
 List of transgender-related topics

References

External links

Yawning Bread's account of Singapore's transgender and sex-change history: - 
Ommaney, F.D, Eastern Windows, 1960. London:Longmans. pp. 39–45

Tourism in Singapore
Places in Singapore
Roads in Singapore
Transgender in Asia
Downtown Core (Singapore)
Shopping districts and streets in Singapore